Josephine Lyons Scott Pinckney (January 25, 1895 – October 4, 1957) was a novelist and poet in the literary revival of the American South after World War I. Her first best-selling novel was the social comedy, Three O'clock Dinner (1945).

Early life
Josephine Pinckney was born in Charleston, South Carolina on January 25, 1895 to Thomas Pinkney and Camilla Scott. She attended Ashley Hall and established a literary magazine there, graduating in 1912. She then attended college at the College of Charleston, Radcliffe College, and Columbia University, and held an honorary degree from the College of Charleston, given 1935. She received the Southern Authors Award in 1946.

Writing career
As a poet, novelist, and essayist, Pinckney was an active participant in the Charleston Renaissance. In 1920, she co-founded the Poetry Society of South Carolina. She was involved in institutions such as the Charleston Museum and Dock Street Theatre and was an early proponent of the historic preservation of Charleston. She was an active member of the Society for the Preservation of Spirituals, which transcribed and annotated African American songs. Both organizations met for the first time at Pinckney's home at 21 King St. in Charleston.

She died October 4, 1957, and is buried in Magnolia Cemetery.

Autobiographical snippet from the dust cover of Three O'clock Dinner:

Josephine Pinckney may be described as a cosmopolitan Charlestonian.  She has traveled widely abroad, spent a year in Italy, lived winters in New York and summers in Mexico, but she always goes back to home and garden in Charleston, just as her family, well known in the south, has for generations.  A literary lady, she has previously published a book of poems, "Sea Drinking Cities" and a novel, Hilton Head.  With DuBose Heyward, Hervey Allen and others, she started the Poetry Society of South Carolina, which has had a strong influence on the rebirth of literature in the South. As a hobby, Miss Pinckney collects and transcribes spirituals which she sings with a group called the Society for the Preservation of Spirituals. Gardening and dogs have a strong appeal for her, and she collects old china and first editions.

Works

Short stories (published in the Virginia Quarterly Review)
"They Shall Return As Strangers" (1934)
"The Merchant of London and the Treacherous Don" (1936)

Essay
"Bulwarks Against Change" (1934)

Novels
Hilton Head (1941)
Three O'clock Dinner (1945)
Great Mischief (1948)
My Son and Foe (1952)
Splendid in Ashes (1958)

Poetry
"Sea Drinking Cities"
"The Outcast"
"Swamp Lilies"

External links

 Josephine Lyons Scott Pinckney A biographical article 
 A book on Amazon.com about Pinckney and her fall into obscurity
 Book information about Three O'Clock Dinner
 Magazine column about the fantasy novel Great Mischief (1948)

 The Citadel Archives: Poetry Society of South Carolina Collection

1895 births
1957 deaths
20th-century American novelists
20th-century American poets
American women novelists
Novelists from South Carolina
Writers of American Southern literature
American women poets
20th-century American women writers
Charleston Renaissance
20th-century American short story writers
American women short story writers
College of Charleston alumni
Radcliffe College alumni
Columbia University alumni
Burials at Magnolia Cemetery (Charleston, South Carolina)